

References

Kapu (caste)
Social groups of Andhra Pradesh